Linda Heidi Schanz (born ) is an American retired actress and model who appeared in several films and television shows from 1995 to 2001. She is known for her female lead role in Universal Soldier: The Return (1999).

Filmography

Film

Television

References

External links

American film actresses
American television actresses
Living people
1971 births
21st-century American women